Manuel González Dufrane (born 9 May 1994) is a Mexican equestrian. He competed in the individual jumping event at the 2020 Summer Olympics.

References

External links
 

1994 births
Living people
Mexican male equestrians
Olympic equestrians of Mexico
Equestrians at the 2020 Summer Olympics
Place of birth missing (living people)
Show jumping riders